Lepmia is a genus of horse flies in the family Tabanidae.

Species
Lepmia hibernus (Wilkerson & Coscarón, 1984)
Lepmia molesta (Wiedemann, 1828)
Lepmia seminigra (Ricardo, 1902)

References

Tabanidae
Brachycera genera
Diptera of South America
Taxa named by Graham Fairchild